Hermann Bosch (10 March 1891 – 15 November 1916) was a German international footballer who played as a midfielder and competed in the 1912 Summer Olympics. He was born in Öhningen am Bodensee. He was a member of the German Olympic squad and played one match in the main tournament as well as one match in the consolation tournament. He was killed during World War I.

See also
 List of Olympians killed in World War I

References

External links

1891 births
1916 deaths
German footballers
Germany international footballers
Olympic footballers of Germany
Footballers at the 1912 Summer Olympics
Karlsruher FV players
German military personnel killed in World War I
German footballers needing infoboxes
Association football midfielders